John Cecil Pearson (14 March 1896 – December 1979) was an English professional footballer who played as a full back in the Football League for Burnley, Brentford and Grimsby Town.

Career statistics

References

1896 births
1979 deaths
Sportspeople from Dudley
English footballers
Association football fullbacks
Cradley Heath F.C. players
Halesowen Town F.C. players
Burnley F.C. players
Brentford F.C. players
Grimsby Town F.C. players
English Football League players